M-Flo Inside: Works Best II was a compilation album released on July 26, 2006, by the Japanese hip-hop group, M-Flo, containing tracks by the group and its members since the release of M-Flo Inside in 2004.

Track listing
Disc 1 (Works Best CD)
 "Lotta Love" / M-Flo loves Minmi
 "Summer Time Love: Remix Tokyo Mode" / M-Flo Loves 日之内絵美 (Emi Hinouchi) & Ryohei
 "Big Bang Romance" / 野宮真貴 (Maki Nomiya) Loves M-Flo
 "One Day: 夜空remix" (Yozora Remix)/ 加藤ミリヤ (Miliyah Kato) Loves M-Flo
 "鍔ゼリアイ" (tsubazeriai) / Gagle feat. Verbal
 "Cosmic Night Run -満漢全席仕様-" - Crazy Ken Band feat. 野宮真貴 (Maki Nomiya) & M-Flo
 "Baby Blue!" / Halcali
 "Life Is Beautiful: Double Ver." / Double with M-Flo & Toku
 "Sunshine" / Yoshika feat. Verbal
 "Let Go [acoustic version]" / Yoshika Loves M-Flo
 "Happy Drive: Taste Your Stuff" / Bennie K with M-Flo
 "Can't Stop Lovin' You" / Black Bottom Brass Band feat. 日之内絵美 (Emi Hinouchi) & Verbal
 "Fish" / 安室奈美恵 (Namie Amuro) feat. Verbal & Arkitec
 "Kamikaze 108" / Teriyaki Boyz

Disc 2 (MIX CD)
 "Intro" / Verbal + Taku
 "How You Like Me Now?"
 "Theme from Flo Jack"
 "Quantum Leap" / Jamosa
 "Orbit 3"
 "Planet Shining"
 "Just Be"
 "So You Say"
 "One Sugar Dream" / Ryohei
 "Been So Long"
 "L.O.T. (Love or Truth)"
 "The Bandwagon"
 "Let Go: Deckstream Remix"
 "Hands"
 "Expo Expo" / Wise
 "Ten Below Blazing"
 "Chronopsychology"
 "Tell Me (Ryohei Remix feat. Verbal)" / Fantastic Plastic Machine feat. Benjamin Diamond
 "Dispatch"
 "What It Is" / L-Vokal
 "Mirrorball Satellite 2012"
 "Funny Money Girl" / Ajapai feat. Verbal
 "Prism"
 "Come Again"
 "Miss You"

M-Flo albums
2006 greatest hits albums
Avex Group compilation albums